is a song written by Japanese singer Ringo Sheena and has several versions.

Background 
The song was first released as a digital single on November 11, 2006, performed by Ringo Sheena and Soil & "Pimp" Sessions and sung in Japanese. This version of the song later showed up on her fourth album. The distributor is Toshiba EMI. This song ascended to the number-one position on iTunes Store in Japan.

The song was performed again on her single "Kono Yo no Kagiri" (2007) as an instrumental tango "Karisome Otome (Hitokuchizaka Ver.)," and "Karisome Otome (Tameikisannoh Ver.)" on the soundtrack album Heisei Fūzoku (2007), performed in English. These two versions were recorded by the Karisome Orchestra, a collaboration with Neko Saito. They were recorded in September 2006.

The single charted at number 67 on the RIAJ's monthly ringtone chart for November 2006.

The song was covered by Maki Nagayama on Asuka Sakai's compilation album Little Love Light: 10 Songs for 10 Stories in 2009.

Track listing

Personnel 

Personnel details were sourced from "Kono Yo no Kagiri", Heisei Fūzoku and Sanmon Gossips liner notes booklet.Death Jazz version by Soil & "Pimp" SessionsGoldman Akita – contrabass
Jōsei – piano, keyboards
Midorin – drums
Motoharu – saxophone
Shachō – agitator
Ringo Sheena – vocals, songwriting
Tabu Zombie – trumpetHitokuchizaka and Tameikisannoh versions by the Karisome Orchestra'

Masaki Hayashi – piano
Natsuki Kido – acoustic guitar, electric guitar
Keisuke Ohta – viola
Neko Saito – conductor
Yoshiaki Sato – accordion
Ringo Sheena – vocals, songwriting
Torigoe Yūsuke – bass
Yūji Yamada – viola

References 

Ringo Sheena songs
2006 songs
2006 singles
Songs written by Ringo Sheena
Japanese film songs